The members of the 32nd General Assembly of Newfoundland were elected in the Newfoundland general election held in August 1959. The general assembly sat from April 20, 1960, to October 23, 1962. The assembly moved to the newly constructed Confederation Building in 1960.

The Liberal Party led by Joey Smallwood formed the government.

John R. Courage served as speaker.

There were four sessions of the 32nd General Assembly:

Campbell Leonard Macpherson served as lieutenant governor of Newfoundland.

Members of the Assembly 
The following members were elected to the assembly in 1959:

Notes:

By-elections 
By-elections were held to replace members for various reasons:

Notes:

References 

Terms of the General Assembly of Newfoundland and Labrador